Pipri is a village in Bakshi Ka Talab block of Lucknow district, Uttar Pradesh, India. As of 2011, its population is 318, in 69 households. It was first officially upgraded to village status for the 2011 Census.

References 

Villages in Lucknow district